The 641st Aviation Regiment is an aviation regiment of the U.S. Army.

Structure
 1st Battalion
 Command Sergeant Major, Prabhsimran Singh
 2nd Battalion
 Headquarters and Headquarters Company (OR ARNG)
 Company A flying a C-12 at Army Aviation Support Facility #1 at McNary Field (OR ARNG) former Det.47 OSACOM
 Detachment 1 flying a C-12 at Army Aviation Support Facility #1 at Lincoln Airport (NE ARNG), former Det.43 OSACOM.
 Detachment 2 flying a C-26 at Army Aviation Support Facility #2 at Rickenbacker IAP, Ohio (OH ARNG), former Det.21 OSACOM.
 Detachment 3 flying a C-12 at Army Aviation Support Facility at Bangor International Airport (ME ARNG), former Det.14 OSACOM
 Detachment 4 flying a C-12 at Goldwater ANGB (AZ ARNG) former Det.31 OSACOM.
 Detachment 5 flying a C-26 at Army Aviation Support Facility at Dane County Regional Airport (WI ARNG), former Det.52 OSACOM.
 Detachment 6 flying a C-12 (TN ARNG), former Det.25 OSACOM
 Detachment 7 flying a C-12 at Army Aviation Support Facility #1 at Hammond Northshore Regional Airport (LA ARNG), former Det.38 OSACOM.
 Company B flying a C-12 at Army Aviation Support Facility #1 at Hawkins Field (airport) (MS ARNG), former Det.16 OSACOM.
 Detachment 1 flying a C-12 Army Aviation Support Facility #1 at Muir Army Airfield (PA ARNG), former Det.22 OSACOM
 Detachment 2 flying a C-12 Army Aviation Support Facility at Bradley International Airport (CT ARNG), former Det.6 OSACOM
 Detachment 3 flying a C-12 Army Aviation Support Facility at Reno Stead Airport (NV ARNG), former Det.45 OSACOM
 Detachment 4 flying a C-12 Army Aviation Support Facility #1 at Montgomery Regional Airport (AL ARNG) former Det.5 OSACOM
 Detachment 5 fling a C-26 Army Aviation Support Facility at McEntire Joint National Guard Base (SC ARNG), former Det.24 OSACOM
 Detachment 6 flying a C-12 at Ankeny Regional Airport (IA ARNG), former Det.34 OSACOM
 Detachment 7 flying a C-12 at Army Aviation Support Facility #1 at Austin-Bergstrom IAP (TX ARNG), former Det.49 OSACOM
 Company C flying a C-12 at Army Aviation Support Facility at Elmendorf Air Force Base (AK ARNG), former Det.54 OSACOM
 Detachment 1 flying a C-12 at Army Aviation Support Facility #1 at Forbes Field (airport) (KS ARNG), former Det.37 OSACOM
 Detachment 2 flying a C-12 at Phillips Army Airfield (MD ARNG), former Det.13 OSACOM
 Detachment 3 flying a C-26 at Army Aviation Support Facility #1 at Wheeler Army Airfield (HI ARNG), former Det.55 OSACOM
 Detachment 4 flying a C-12 at Army Aviation Support Facility at South Valley Regional Airport and Roland R. Wright Air National Guard Base, (UT ARNG), former Det.50 OSACOM
 Detachment 5 flying a C-12 at Army Aviation Support Facility at Rapid City Regional Airport (SD ARNG), former Det.48 OSACOM
 Detachment 6 
 Detachment 7 flying a C-12 at Army Aviation Support Facility at Isla Grande Airport (PR ARNG), former Det.56 OSACOM
2nd Battalion is part of the 63rd Aviation Brigade and is administratively supervised by the OR ARNG through the 82nd Troop Command Brigade.

References

641